The Oklahoma Open is the Oklahoma state open golf tournament, open to both amateur and professional golfers. It is organized by the Oklahoma Golf Association. It has been played every year since 1910 at a variety of courses around the state. It was considered a PGA Tour event briefly in the 1920s.

Winners

2022 Chandler Phillips
2021 Zach James
2020 Andrew Hudson
2019 Max McGreevy
2018 Casey Fernandez
2017 Max McGreevy
2016 Michael Balcar
2015 Josh Creel
2014 Robby Ormand
2013 Chris Worrell (amateur)
2012 Matt VanCleave
2011 Robert Streb
2010 Rhein Gibson
2009 Robert Streb
2008 Brett Myers
2007 Rocky Walcher
2006 Kyle Flinton
2005 Kyle Willmann
2004 Rocky Walcher
2003 Cody Freeman
2002 Chris Noel
2001 Lucas Glover
2000 John Bizik
1999 Todd Hamilton
1998 Kevin Dillen
1997 Gil Morgan
1996 David Edwards
1995 Willie Wood
1994 David Edwards
1993 Mark Hayes
1992 Bryan Norton
1991 Jim Kane
1990 Willie Wood
1989 Doug Martin
1988 Mark Hayes
1987 Bob Tway
1986 Lindy Miller
1985 Bob Tway
1984 Kenny Huff
1983 Tom Jones
1982 Doug Tewell
1981 Gil Morgan
1980 Jaime Gonzalez
1979 Danny Edwards
1978 Lindy Miller
1977 Danny Edwards
1976 Mark Hayes
1975 Danny Edwards
1974 Bobby Stroble
1973 Spike Kelley
1972 Don Maddox
1971 Bob Dickson
1970 Chris Gers
1969 Chris Gers
1968 Grier Jones
1967 Jamie Gough III
1966 Bob Dickson
1965 Buster Cupit
1964 Jerry Pittman
1963 Labron Harris Jr.
1962 Babe Hiskey
1961 Jimmy Gauntt
1960 Jimmy Gauntt
1959 Joe Walser, Jr.
1958 Buster Cupit
1957 Johnny Palmer
1956 Jimmy Gauntt
1955 Jimmy Gauntt
1954 Jimmy Gauntt
1953 Labron Harris
1951–1952 No tournament
1950 Charles Klein
1949 Tex Consolver
1948 Jimmy Gauntt
1947 George Getchell
1946 Ray Gafford
1943–1945 No tournament
1942 George Whitehead
1941 Buddy Poteet
1940 Billy Simpson
1939 Zell Eaton
1938 Billy Simpson
1937 Jack Malloy
1936 Clarence Yockey
1935 Walter Emery
1934 Harold "Jug" McSpaden
1933 Jimmy Gullane
1932 Jimmy Gullane
1931 Harold "Jug" McSpaden
1930 Clarence Clark
1929 Dick Grout
1928 Harold Long
1927 Dick Grout
1926 Ed Dudley
1925 Ed Dudley
1924 Bill Creavy
1923 Bill Mehlhorn
1922 Phil Hessler
1921 Sandy Baxter
1920 William Nichols
1919 John Gatherum
1918 Jock Taylor
1917 Jock Collins
1916 William Nichols
1915 Chester Williams
1914 William Nichols
1913 Chester Nelson
1912 Chester Nelson
1911 William Nichols
1910 William Nichols

External links
Oklahoma Golf Association
List of winners

Former PGA Tour events
Golf in Oklahoma
State Open golf tournaments